Vladyslav Savchuk (born 1 November 1979) is a retired Ukrainian footballer who currently coaches youth team of the Ukrainian Premier League club FC Kolos Kovalivka.

External links 

 

1979 births
Living people
Footballers from Kyiv
Ukrainian footballers
FC Oleksandriya players
FC Torpedo Mogilev players
FC Dnipro Cherkasy players
FC Tom Tomsk players
FC Metalist Kharkiv players
FC Zorya Luhansk players
FC Nistru Otaci players
FC Sodovik Sterlitamak players
Kotwica Kołobrzeg footballers
FC Dinaz Vyshhorod players
FC Kolos Kovalivka players
Ukrainian Premier League players
Ukrainian expatriate footballers
Expatriate footballers in Belarus
Ukrainian expatriate sportspeople in Belarus
Expatriate footballers in Russia
Ukrainian expatriate sportspeople in Russia
Expatriate footballers in Moldova
Ukrainian expatriate sportspeople in Moldova
Expatriate footballers in Poland
Ukrainian expatriate sportspeople in Poland
Association football midfielders
Ukrainian football managers
SC Chaika Petropavlivska Borshchahivka managers